...a nastal chaos is the debut album by Czech hip hop group Chaozz, released in 1996. It was certified platinum in the Czech Republic and gold in Slovakia, selling just under 50,000 copies. Music videos were made for "Televize", "Policijeee", "Planeta opic" and "Nejhorsi den v mym zivote"

Track listing

Album singles

1996 debut albums
Chaozz albums
PolyGram albums